Pizotifen (INN) or pizotyline (USAN), trade name  Sandomigran, is a benzocycloheptene-based drug used as a medicine, primarily as a preventive to reduce the frequency of recurrent migraine headaches.

Uses
The main medical use for pizotifen is for the prevention of migraine and cluster headache. Pizotifen is one of a range of medications used for this purpose, other options include propranolol, topiramate, valproic acid, cyproheptadine and amitriptyline. While pizotifen is effective in adults, evidence of efficacy in children is limited, and its use is limited by side effects, principally drowsiness and weight gain, and it is usually not the first choice medicine for preventing migraines, instead being used as an alternative when other drugs have failed to be effective. It is not effective in relieving migraine attacks once in progress. Pizotifen has also been reported as highly effective in a severe case of erythromelalgia, a rare neurovascular disease that is sometimes refractory to the other drugs named above.

Other applications for which pizotifen may be used include as an antidepressant, or for the treatment of anxiety or social phobia. Animal studies also suggest that pizotyline could be used in the treatment of serotonin syndrome or MDMA overdose in a similar manner to the closely related antihistamine/antiserotonin medication cyproheptadine.

Adverse effects
Side effects include sedation, dry mouth, drowsiness, increased appetite and weight gain. Occasionally it may cause nausea, headaches, or dizziness. In rare cases, anxiety, aggression and depression may also occur.

Contraindications
Caution is required in patients having closed angle glaucoma and in patients with a predisposition to urinary retention as the medication exhibits a relatively small anticholinergic effect. Dose adjustment is required in people who have chronic kidney disease. Liver injury has also been reported. Pizotifen treatment should be discontinued if there is any clinical evidence of liver dysfunction during treatment. Caution is advised in patients having a history of epilepsy.
Withdrawal symptoms like depression, tremor, nausea, anxiety, malaise, dizziness, sleep disorder and weight decrease have been reported following abrupt cessation of pizotifen.
Pizotifen is contraindicated in patients who suffer from hypersensitivity to any of its components, also Pizotifen is contraindicated in gastric outlet obstruction, pregnancy, angle-closure glaucoma and difficulty urinating.

Pharmacology
Pizotifen is a serotonin antagonist acting mainly at the 5-HT2A and 5HT2C receptors. It also has some activity as an antihistamine as well as some anticholinergic activity.

See also 
 Benzocycloheptene
 Cyproheptadine
 Ketotifen

References

External links 
 Sandomigran drug data sheet

5-HT2 antagonists
Alpha-1 blockers
Benzocycloheptathiophenes
H1 receptor antagonists
Muscarinic antagonists
Piperidines